is a female Japanese judoka.

She started judo at the age of 6.

Her favorite technique is harai Goshi.

In 2009, she won the bronze medal in the +78 kg weight class at the World Judo Championships Juniors in Paris.

In 2015, she won the bronze medal in the heavyweight (+78 kg) division at the 2015 World Judo Championships.

References

External links
 

1990 births
Living people
Japanese female judoka
Olympic bronze medalists for Japan
Olympic judoka of Japan
Olympic medalists in judo
Judoka at the 2016 Summer Olympics
Medalists at the 2016 Summer Olympics
Universiade medalists in judo
Universiade gold medalists for Japan
Medalists at the 2009 Summer Universiade
Medalists at the 2011 Summer Universiade
21st-century Japanese women